Turbonilla ornata, common name the ornate turbonilla,  is a species of sea snail, a marine gastropod mollusk in the family Pyramidellidae, the pyrams and their allies.

Description
The thin, white shell is closely longitudinally ribbed and spirally striate. Its length attains 6 mm. The 10 whorls of the teleoconch are slightly convex. The suture is deep and crenulated.

Distribution
This species occurs in the Atlantic Ocean off the Mid-Atlantic Ridge and from North Carolina to the Dominican Republic; in the Caribbean Sea off Jamaica, Guadeloupe and Martinique.

References

External links
 To Encyclopedia of Life
 To Malacolog
 To USNM Invertebrate Zoology Mollusca Collection
 To World Register of Marine Species

ornata
Gastropods described in 1840